= FAHA =

FAHA may refer to:

- Finnish American Home Association (non-profit organization founded by the Finnish community of northern California)
- Fellow of the American Heart Association
- Fellow of the Australian Academy of the Humanities
